"Perfect World" is the first single from indie rock band Gossip's fifth studio album A Joyful Noise. The song reached the top 40 in 6 countries with its biggest success in Switzerland, where the album also reached number 1.

Track listing

Digital
 "Perfect World" (radio edit)

CD single
 "Perfect World" (radio edit)
 "Perfect World" (instrumental)

Chart performance
The song entered the top 30 in 6 different countries, reaching number 11 in Switzerland and number 13 in Germany, where it was certified Gold for shipments of 150,000 copies.

Charts

Weekly charts

Year-end charts

References

2012 singles
Gossip (band) songs
Songs written by Brian Higgins (producer)
2011 songs
Columbia Records singles
Songs written by Beth Ditto